Signature Move is a 2017 American indie comedy-drama film directed by Jennifer Reeder and co-written and produced by Fawzia Mirza about a Pakistani Muslim lesbian living in Chicago with her mother. Fawzia Mirza also introduced herself as a lesbian on Twitter before the film was announced. The film premiered at the 2017 South by Southwest Film Festival.

Premise
Zaynab (Fawzia Mirza), a thirty-something Pakistani, Muslim, lesbian in Chicago takes care of her TV-obsessed mother Parveen (Shabana Azmi). As Zaynab falls for Alma (Sari Sanchez), a bold and very bright Mexican woman, she searches for her identity in life, love and wrestling.

Cast 
 Fawzia Mirza as Zaynab
 Shabana Azmi as Parveen
 Sari Sanchez as Alma
 Audrey Francis as Jayde
 Charin Alvarez as Rosa
 Mark Hood as Milo
 Molly Brennan as Killian
 Minita Gandhi as Hina
 Mia Park as Bookstore Customer
 The scholar Kareem Khubchandani has a cameo as a man outside on whom Parveen spies.

Production

Casting
Fawzia Mirza approached Shabana Azmi in Chicago when she was there to work in a play. She signed her to play the role in the film. The film features Fawzia Mirza as a Muslim lesbian and Shabana Azmi as her mother. The cast also includes Sari Sanchez, Audrey Francis and Charin Alvarez.

Filming
Shabana Azmi moved to Chicago in early August 2016. Fawzia posted a selfie with Azmi on Instagram and announced that they have started the shooting of the film.

Awards

See also 

 List of LGBT-related films directed by women

References

Further reading

External links 
 
 

Lesbian-related films
Films about Pakistani Americans
American LGBT-related films
2017 LGBT-related films
2017 films
American romantic comedy-drama films
LGBT-related romantic comedy-drama films
Films shot in Chicago
2010s English-language films
2010s Urdu-language films
2017 multilingual films
Spanish-language American films
2010s American films